Heterotropus is a genus of bee flies in the family Bombyliidae. It is the only genus in the subfamily Heterotropinae, which formerly contained at least four genera. There are more than 45 species in the genus Heterotropus.

References

Further reading
 
 
 

Bombyliidae
Taxa named by Theodor Becker
Taxa named by Hermann Loew